Imāla (also transliterated ; , lit. "inclination") is a phenomenon in Arabic comprising the fronting and raising of Old Arabic /ā/ toward /ī/, and the old short /a/ toward /i/. Imāla and the factors conditioning its occurrence were described for the first time by Sibawayh. According to as-Sirafi and Ibn Jinni (10th century), the vowel of the imāla was pronounced somewhere between /a/ and /i/, suggesting a realization of [e].

Sibawayh primarily discusses imāla as a shift of /ā/ to /ē/ in the vicinity of /i/ or /ī/, an allophonic variation that can be characterized as umlaut or i-mutation. Additionally, Sibawayh’s imāla subsumes occurrences of a phonemic vowel /ē/ resulting from the collapse of Old Arabic triphthongs. For this reason, not all instances of imāla can be characterized as a vowel shift from an original /ā/ towards the /ī/.

Imāla was not a general phenomenon, occurring only in some of the old dialects. Yet, the grammarians regarded it as a legitimate phenomenon from the normative point of view when it occurred in certain conditionings. In the context of Arabic dialectology, the term imāla is also used to describe a variety of phenomena involving mid-vowels in place of the Standard Arabic low-vowel. Imāla also features in several  ("styles of recitation") of the Quran.

Imāla in the grammatical tradition 
This is confirmed by evidence in the Kitab. Historically and anciently,  was a feature in both verbs and inflected nouns. There are several processes which the term  describes, of the most common are outlined below:

i-mutation
The shift is blocked whenever there are emphatic or uvular consonants (ṣ, ḍ, ṭ, ẓ, ġ, q, x) adjacent to the /ā/ or following it, but is not blocked if the umlaut-triggering /i/ stands between the blocking consonant and a following /ā/. The blocking effect of emphatics is shown in the following examples:
 Reflexes of CāCiC: ʿēbid “worshipper” vs. ḍāmin “guarantor”
 Reflexes of CaCāCiC: masēǧid “mosques” vs. maʿāliq “pluck of animals”
 Reflexes of CaCāCīC: mafētīḥ “keys” vs. manāfīx “bellows”

III-w/y imāla 
Sibawayh says that nouns with final root consonant w (III-w) do not undergo imāla, eg. qafā “back”, ʿaṣā “stick”. On the other hand, nouns with root-final y (III-y) and feminine nouns with suffix <-y> undergo imāla, eg. miʿzē “goat”, ḥublē “pregnant”. Such imāla is not blocked by emphatic consonants, eg. muʿṭē “gifted”.

According to Sibawayh, a similar imāla applies to verbs regardless of the underlying root consonant: ġazē (III-w) “he raided”, ramē “he threw” (III-y). However other grammarians describe varieties in which imāla applies to III-y verbs, but not III-w verbs. Sibawayh also describes a system in which only III-y nouns and feminine nouns with suffix <-y> have imāla, it being absent from verbs altogether.

II-w/y imāla 
According to Sibawayh, imāla is applied to hollow verbs (II-w or II-y) whose 1sg. has an /i/ vowel, such as xēfa (1sg. xiftu) and ǧēʾa (1sg. ǧiʾtu). Sibawayh says that this is the practice for some people of Hijaz. Additionally, al-Farra’ says that this is the practice of the common people of Najd, among Tamim, Asad, and Qays.

Imāla in Quranic recitation 
Many  of the Quran implement imāla at least once. Some, like those of Hafs or Qalun, use it only once, but in others, imāla affects hundreds of words because of a general rule of a specific  or as a specific word prescribed to undergo imāla.

Lexically determined i-mutation 
While i-mutation is non-phonemic in Sibawayh’s description, its occurrences in the Quranic reading traditions are highly lexically determined. For example, Hisham and Ibn Dhakwan apply i-mutation to CaCāCiC plural mašēribu “drinks” (Q36:73) but not al-ǧawāriḥi “the predators” (Q5:4) or manāzila “positions” (Q36:39).

III-w/y imāla 
Al-Kisaʾi and Hamza are known for having phonemic /ē/ as the realization of alif maqsura in III-y nouns and verbs, as well as in derived final-weak forms and forms having the feminine ending written with <-y>, such as ḥublē “pregnant”. Warsh, from the way of al-Azraq, realizes this extra phoneme as /ǟ/.

Other readers apply this imāla only sporadically: Hafs reads it only once in maǧrē-hā (Q11:41). Šubah only has it in reʾē “he saw”, ramē “he threw”, and ʾaʿmē ʿblindʾ in its two attestations in Q17:72.

II-w/y imāla 
Hamzah applies imāla to zēda “to increase”, šēʾa “to want”, ǧēʾa “to come”, xēba “to fail”, rēna “to seize”, xēfa “to fear”, zēġa “to wander”, ṭēba “to be good”, ḍēqa “to taste” and ḥēqa “to surround”. Some irregular lexical exceptions where Hamza does not apply it include māta “he died”, kālū-hum “they measured them”, zālat “cease”, and zāġat.

Imāla in modern Arabic dialects

i-mutation 
In the modern qeltu dialects of Iraq and Anatolia and in the modern dialect of Aleppo, the factors conditioning medial imāla (i-mutation) correspond to those described by Sibawayh in the 8th century. In these modern dialects, medial imāla occurs when the historical vowel of the syllable adjacent to /ā/ was /i/ or /ī/. For instance:
 *kilāb > klēb “dogs” in Christian Baghdadi, Mosul, Anatolia, and Aleppo
 *jāmiʿ > jēməʿ “mosque” in Christian Baghdadi and in Mosul and Anatolia
 *sakākīn > sakēkīn “knives” in the Jewish dialect of Mosul

It does not occur in the proximity of ə < *a or ə < *u, however:

 *xabbāz > xəbbāz “baker” in Jewish Baghdadi.
 *sukkān > səkkān “inhabitants” in Jewish Baghdadi.

In addition to the mentioned dialects, this type of medial imāla occurs in the qeltu dialect of Deir ez-Zor, the dialects of Hatay and Cilicia in Turkey, and the dialects of some Bedouin tribes in the Negev

III-w/y imāla 
Sibawayh’s description of the final imāla (III-w/y imāla) is also, in general, similar to that that prevailing in the modern qəltu dialects and in the dialect of Aleppo. One of the most striking points of resemblance is that in some dialects in Sibawayh’s time, this final imāla occurred only in nouns and adjectives, and not in verbs; in the modern qəltu dialects and in Aleppo the situation is exactly the same, as illustrated by the examples sakāġi (< *sakārē) “drunk (pl.)” and aʿmi (< *ʾaʿmē) “blind” vs. bana (< *banā) “he built”.

Consonantally conditioned medial imāla 
Many modern dialects outside Iraq have an imāla completely conditioned by the consonantal environment of /ā/. This type of imāla does not correspond to any type mentioned by Sibawayh. It occurs in many Lebanese dialects, in the Druze dialects of Hauran and the Golan, in the dialects of the Syrian desert oases Qariten and Palmyra, in the Bedouin dialects of Sahil Maryut in Egypt, and in the Jabali dialect of Cyrenaica.

Effect on other languages

The accent of Andalusia in Moorish Spain had imāla, and many Arabic loan words and city names in Spanish still do so. Its largest city, Seville, has a name that is a notable example of imāla.

See also
Tenseness
Vowel height
Andalusian Arabic
North Levantine Arabic
Tunisian Arabic
North Mesopotamian Arabic

References

 Word-final imaala in contemporary Levantine Arabic : a case of language variation and change, Durand, Emilie Pénélope, University of Texas, Austin, 2011, read online

Phonetics
Arabic language
Arabic phonology
Lebanese Arabic